Ty Anthony Montgomery II (born January 22, 1993) is an American football wide receiver for the New England Patriots of the National Football League (NFL). He played college football at Stanford. Montgomery was drafted as a wide receiver by the Green Bay Packers in the third round of the 2015 NFL Draft. In 2016, he changed positions to running back.

Early years
Montgomery attended St. Mark's School of Texas in Dallas, Texas, where he was a five-sport star in football, track, basketball, baseball, and
lacrosse. He played as a wide receiver, running back, and quarterback for the Lions football team. As a senior, he had 823 rushing yards on 93 carries and 17 catches with 10 total touchdowns. He had 118 catches and 36 total touchdowns during his high school career.

As a standout track & field athlete, Montgomery competed as a sprinter and long jumper. At the 2011 SPC Championships, he earned first-place finishes in both the 100-meter dash (10.81 s) and 200-meter dash (22.20 s), while also anchoring the 4x100 squad to victory (43.15 s). He posted a career-best leap of 6.55 meters (21 ft, 3 in) in the long jump at the 2011 Lancaster Meet of Champions.

College career
Montgomery played wide receiver at Stanford University from 2011 to 2014 under head coach David Shaw. He wore uniform number 88 during his first two seasons at Stanford. When he returned for his junior season with renewed vigor, Montgomery says he switched from No. 88 to No. 7 to represent his fresh start and his faith, citing the seventh day in Christianity. Prior to the start of Montgomery's junior season, Stanford announced they would retire uniform number 7 in honor of legendary Stanford quarterback John Elway and stated that "wide receiver Ty Montgomery and defensive end Aziz Shittu will be the last to wear that jersey at Stanford."

As a freshman in 2011, Montgomery contributed on offense and special teams. On October 15, in a game against Washington State, he had three kick returns for 147 net yards and a touchdown. On November 19, against California, he had a 34-yard rushing touchdown on his lone carry of the game. In the Fiesta Bowl against Oklahoma State, he had seven receptions for 120 yards and a receiving touchdown. Montgomery had 24 receptions for 350 receiving yards and two receiving touchdowns to go along with 42 rushing yards and one rushing touchdown.

As a sophomore in 2012, Montgomery continued his role on offense and special teams. Overall, he finished the season with 26 receptions for 213 yards and had 11 kick returns for 293 net yards for a 26.6 average.

As a junior in 2013, Montgomery was a consensus All-American as a return specialist. On October 5, against Washington, he had four kick returns for 204 net yards and a touchdown. In the next game against Utah, he had eight receptions for 131 receiving yards to go along with three kick returns for 160 net yards and a touchdown. On November 23, against California, he had 160 receiving yards, four receiving touchdowns, and 31 rushing yards with a rushing touchdown. He led the nation with a 31.2-yard kickoff return average and scored two touchdowns. In addition, he had 61 receptions for 958 receiving yards and 10 touchdowns to go along with 159 rushing yards and two rushing touchdowns.

As a senior in 2014, Montgomery still produced for the Cardinal, but he did suffer through some regression. In the season opener against UC Davis, he had 77 receiving yards, one receiving touchdown, and a punt return touchdown. Overall, he finished his senior season with 61 receptions for 604 receiving yards and three touchdowns to go along with 144 rushing yards and a rushing touchdown. He finished his collegiate career with 172 receptions for 2,125 yards and 15 touchdown receptions.

Collegiate statistics

Professional career

2015 NFL Draft

Montgomery was selected in the third round (94th overall) by the Green Bay Packers in the 2015 NFL Draft. On May 21, 2015, Montgomery signed his contract with the Packers.

Green Bay Packers

2015

On September 13, he made his NFL debut against the Chicago Bears and had three kick returns for 106 net yards. On September 28, against the Kansas City Chiefs, he had his first professional receiving touchdown. He was placed on injured reserve on December 21, 2015, after sustaining an ankle injury against the San Diego Chargers in Week 6. He finished his rookie season with 15 receptions for 136 yards and two receiving touchdowns.

2016
For the first four games of the 2016 season, Montgomery saw only 17 snaps on offense and was held to zero catches. However, in a Week 6 game against the Dallas Cowboys he began seeing time in the backfield due to injuries to running backs Eddie Lacy and James Starks. He finished the game with 10 receptions for 98 yards in the Packers' 30–16 loss. In the next game, Montgomery had another 10-catch performance and rushed for 60 yards on nine carries against the Chicago Bears. After having little playing time as a running back due to a sickle-cell trait, head coach Mike McCarthy declared Montgomery a running back on December 13, 2016. In the following week's game against the Bears, Montgomery recorded career highs in carries (16) and yards (162). He also then passed Aaron Rodgers as the team's leading rusher for the 2016 season. He finished the 2016 season with 457 rushing yards, three rushing touchdowns, 44 receptions, and 348 receiving yards.

2017
On September 10, 2017, in the season opener against the Seattle Seahawks, Montgomery had 19 carries for 54 yards, which included a six-yard rushing touchdown, in the 17–9 victory. In the next game, a 34–23 loss to the Atlanta Falcons, he had 10 rushes for 35 yards and a rushing touchdown to go along with six receptions for 75 yards and a receiving touchdown. The receiving touchdown was Aaron Rodgers's 300th career touchdown pass. Montgomery broke his ribs during Week 4 against the Chicago Bears, an eventual 35–14 Packer victory, and missed the next game at the Dallas Cowboys, a 35–31 Packer victory. He returned for the 23–10 loss at the Minnesota Vikings, but was the backup to emerging rookie running back Aaron Jones. After Jones went down with a knee injury in Week 10 at the Bears, Montgomery came in and had a 37-yard rushing touchdown, but left the game after re-injuring his ribs. After missing the next two games, he was placed on injured reserve on December 1, 2017, after undergoing season-ending surgery for an apparent wrist injury. He finished the 2017 season with 273 rushing yards, three rushing touchdowns, 23 receptions, 173 receiving yards, and a receiving touchdown.

2018
In Week 8 against the Los Angeles Rams, the Packers were losing by a score of 29–27 with 2:05 left in the game when Montgomery returned a kick from the endzone and fumbled the ball.  The ball was recovered by the Rams and they went on to win the game.  After the game, it was reported that Montgomery had been taken off the field for a drive and was told to take a knee on the kick return.  Montgomery would be traded just two days after the game and with less than an hour left before the trade deadline. In seven games with the Packers in 2018, he totaled 26 carries for 105 rushing yards and a rushing touchdown to go along with 15 receptions for 170 receiving yards.

Baltimore Ravens
On October 30, 2018, Montgomery was traded to the Baltimore Ravens in exchange for a seventh-round pick in the 2020 NFL Draft. In six games with the Ravens, he had 83 rushing yards and ten receptions for 65 yards. In the Wild Card Round loss to the Los Angeles Chargers, he had six kick returns for 106 net yards.

New York Jets
On April 11, 2019, Montgomery signed with the New York Jets. In the 2019 season, Montgomery totaled 32 carries for 103 rushing yards to go along with 13 receptions for 90 receiving yards.

New Orleans Saints
Montgomery signed with New Orleans Saints on May 15, 2020. He was placed on injured reserve on September 26, 2020, with a hamstring injury. He was activated on November 6, 2020. 
In Week 17 against the Carolina Panthers, Montgomery rushed for 105 yards during the 33–7 win.

On March 6, 2021, Montgomery re-signed with the Saints on a one-year contract. In the 2021 season, Montgomery appeared in 14 games and finished with 15 carries for 44 rushing yards and 16 receptions for 95 receiving yards.

New England Patriots
On March 17, 2022, Montgomery signed a two-year, $3.6 million contract with the New England Patriots. He was placed on injured reserve on September 13.

NFL career statistics

Regular season

Postseason

References

External links
New England Patriots bio
Stanford Cardinal bio

1993 births
All-American college football players
American football return specialists
American football running backs
American football wide receivers
Baltimore Ravens players
Green Bay Packers players
Living people
New Orleans Saints players
New York Jets players
Players of American football from Jackson, Mississippi
Players of American football from Dallas
Stanford Cardinal football players
St. Mark's School (Texas) alumni
New England Patriots players